The discography of Giorgio Moroder includes thirteen studio albums and ten soundtracks, as well as numerous production credits. When in Munich in the 1970s, he started his own record label called Oasis Records, which several years later became a subdivision of Casablanca Records. He produced huge hits for Donna Summer during the late-1970s disco era, including "Bad Girls", "Last Dance", "Love to Love You Baby", "No More Tears (Enough Is Enough)", "Dim All the Lights", "MacArthur Park", "Hot Stuff", "On the Radio", and "I Feel Love", and is the founder of the former Musicland Studios in Munich, a recording studio used by many renowned artists including Electric Light Orchestra, Led Zeppelin, Queen and Elton John.

Moroder also produced a number of electronic disco hits for the Three Degrees, two albums for Sparks, and a handful of songs on Bonnie Tyler's album Bitterblue as well as her 1985 single "Here She Comes". Moroder also created a score of songs for performers including David Bowie, Kylie Minogue, Irene Cara, Janet Jackson, Madleen Kane, Melissa Manchester, Blondie, Japan, and France Joli. He has stated that the work of which he is most proud is Berlin's "Take My Breath Away".

Albums

Studio albums

Soundtrack albums

Compilations

Singles

As lead artist

As featured artist

Promotional singles

Other charted songs

References

External links
Discogs.com

Discographies of Italian artists
Disco discographies